Clarkson was launched at Kingston upon Hull in 1806. Initially she traded with South America. She then made a voyage to Port Jackson, returning to England via India. On the way she participated in the discovery by Europeans of some islands in the Solomon Sea. After her return she traded primarily between Hull and Quebec, and on one occasion took migrants Quebec. She was last listed in 1833.

Career
Clarkson first appeared in Lloyd's Register (LR) in 1806.

On 2 July 1810 Clarkson, Scaife, master, sailed for the Brazils.

 
On 21 October 1811 Clarkson, Clarkson, master, was at Deal, waiting to sail for Botany Bay. On 26 January 1812 she arrived at Rio de Janeiro; she sailed from Rio 6 February. She arrived at Port Jackson on 7 May with stores for the government. She sailed on 1 August, bound for Calcutta. 

These appear to be the Laughlan (Nada) Islands of Waboma and Budelun in the Solomon Sea. Clarkson arrived back at Gravesend on 12 August 1813. 

On 22 October 1825 Clarkson, Ward, master, was returning to Hull from Quebec when she went onshore at Green Island Reef. She received considerable damage and was obliged to unload.

On 3 May 1827 Clarkson, Ward, master, arrived at Quebec with 44 settlers from Hull. She cleared Customs to return to Hull 30 May.

In December 1831 Clarkson, Irvin, master, was brought into Hull damaged. She had to discharge in the Humber.

Fate
Clarkson was last listed in the registers in 1833.

Notes, citations, and references
Notes

Citations

References
 
 

1806 ships
Ships built in Kingston upon Hull
Age of Sail merchant ships of England
Maritime incidents in October 1825
Migrant ships to Canada